Jindřich Kotrla (born March 7, 1975) is a Czech professional ice hockey player. He played with HC Kladno in the Czech Extraliga during the 2010–11 Czech Extraliga season.

References

External links 
 
 

1975 births
Czech ice hockey left wingers
Rytíři Kladno players
Living people
Motor České Budějovice players
HC Most players
BK Mladá Boleslav players
HC Sparta Praha players
HC Karlovy Vary players
HC Litvínov players
Sportspeople from Most (city)
KLH Vajgar Jindřichův Hradec players